Brachylabinae is a subfamily of earwigs, and contains three genera. Ctenisolabis and Metisolabis were cited by both Steinmann and Srivastava, while Brachylabis were cited by Steinmann, Srivastava, and Chen & Ma.

References

External links 
 The Earwig Research Centre's Brachylabinae database Source for references: type Brachylabinae in the "subfamily" field and click "search".

Anisolabididae
Dermaptera subfamilies